Joseph Daniel Brookhart (born October 17, 1964) is an American football coach and former player.  He was most recently an assistant coach at the University of Colorado at Boulder, where he was hired as passing game coordinator, tight ends coach, and special teams coordinator on Jon Embree's staff in December 2010. Brookhart was the head coach at the University of Akron from 2004 to 2009, compiling a record of 30–42.  His Akron Zips won the Mid-American Conference (MAC) in 2005, and he was honored as the MAC Coach of the Year the previous season.  Brookhart played college football at Brigham Young University as a freshman walk-on before transferring to Colorado State University. He has also served as an assistant coach at the University of Pittsburgh and with the Denver Broncos of the National Football League (NFL).

Playing career
As a three-year starter at wide receiver for the Colorado State Rams, Brookhart finished his career sixth on the program's list of all-time receptions with 111. As of 2006 he was still ranked tenth and with 1,873 career receiving yards is ranked seventh. He was selected an GTE Academic All-American his senior year. After graduation with a bachelor's degree, he signed with the Los Angeles Rams in 1988 but was released the same year.

Coaching career

Early years
Brookhart worked for The International golf tournament in Denver, managing the event's corporate hospitality tents for one year. He then worked for Xerox Corporation. Within three years of selling copiers he was awarded the President's Club Award, an honor given to those who meet a sales quota among the company's top-15 percent. He then worked for two other companies in the Denver and Salt Lake City area. He had been managing a speed camp on the side of his career for high school and collegiate football players.

Brookhart decided to forgo his business career and accepted an unpaid position with the Denver Broncos in 1995. Two years later, he became the assistant coach of tight ends for the Pittsburgh Panthers. He moved on to the wide receivers assistant coach position in 1999 and added offensive coordinator duties in 2000. He coached Larry Fitzgerald.

Akron
Brookhart became the 25th head coach of Akron on December 15, 2003, the program's third head coach since gaining Division I-A status in 1987. In his second season, he led the Zips to their first Mid-American Conference championship and their first bowl game in school history, the 2005 Motor City Bowl, which they lost, 38–31, to the Memphis.  He was fired after the 2009 season when the Zips went 3-9.

Legend High School
JD is now the offensive coordinator   at Legend High School in Parker, Colorado (2018-).

Personal life
Brookhart is married to Jami Brookhart, and they have four children: Joey, JT, John, and Jake.

Head coaching record

References

Living people
1964 births
Akron Zips football coaches
BYU Cougars football players
Colorado Buffaloes football coaches
Colorado State Rams football players
Denver Broncos coaches
Pittsburgh Panthers football coaches
Sportspeople from Pueblo, Colorado
Players of American football from Colorado